James Alder Bateman  (5 April 1925 – 20 October 1987) was a New Zealand politician and educationalist.

Biography

Early life and career
In 1949, Bateman graduated from Victoria University College with a Master of Arts in philosophy and Diploma of Education. After graduating he began a career in teaching and taught at Wellington High School, later becoming first assistant Principal. Bateman was to later serve as founding Principal of the Central Institute of Technology from 1968 to 1985. He was elected president of the Technical Institutes Association in October 1974.

Bateman joined the Labour Party in 1940. His father had been personal secretary to prominent Labour politicians Peter Fraser and Walter Nash.

Political career
He was unsuccessful placing second on both occasions. Bateman later contested the Labour Party nomination for the  seat in 1960 which resulted in a deadlock in the selection committee between himself and union organiser Ron Bailey. As a result of the deadlock the matter was referred to the party national executive. Ultimately, Bateman was unsuccessful.

He was a long-serving member of the Labour Party, deeply involved at its organisational level. He sat for many years on Labour's National Executive, and twice served as the party's Vice-President. Bateman proved to be an effective administrator particularly as he was free from the maelstrom of party politics which other party office holders (who were mostly MPs) were subject to. Bateman stood for President in 1964 on the retirement of Martyn Finlay but was beaten by Norman Kirk by 401 votes to 106.

In 1953 Bateman won a seat on the Wellington City Council on a Labour ticket, aged only 28 he was the youngest councillor elected for decades. He held a seat for three terms until 1962 when he decided not to seek re-election. On the council he chaired the staff committee. Upon his retirement from the council, Bateman cited the increasing amount of time required to participate in council and balancing that with his career and family as the reason for his early withdrawal (aged only 37).

Bateman later became a member of the Wellington Harbour Board, which met less frequently. He was elected in 1965 and served three years on the board until 1968.

Later life and death
In the 1986 New Year Honours, Bateman was appointed an Officer of the Order of the British Empire, in recognition of his service as principal of Central Institute of Technology.

Bateman died in Wellington of cancer on 20 October 1987, aged 62 years, and his ashes were buried at Karori Cemetery.

Notes

References

1925 births
1987 deaths
Victoria University of Wellington alumni
New Zealand educators
Wellington City Councillors
Wellington Harbour Board members
New Zealand Labour Party politicians
Unsuccessful candidates in the 1951 New Zealand general election
Unsuccessful candidates in the 1954 New Zealand general election
Burials at Karori Cemetery
New Zealand Officers of the Order of the British Empire